The Extraordinary and Plenipotentiary Ambassador of Peru to the Arab Republic of Egypt is the official representative of the Republic of Peru to the Arab Republic of Egypt.

The ambassador in Cairo is generally accredited to neighbouring countries, such as Iraq, Iran, Jordan, Lebanon, Sudan and Syria.

Peru and Egypt—then the United Arab Republic—first established relations on October 7, 1963, and have maintained them since.

List of representatives

See also
List of ambassadors of Peru to Algeria
List of ambassadors of Peru to Kenya
List of ambassadors of Peru to Morocco
List of ambassadors of Peru to South Africa

References

Egypt
Peru